Saga Petroleum Company ("Saga") is a Denver, Coloradoheadquartered limited liability company owned by Brent Morse and Charles Farmer. Saga Petroleum operates and drills oil and gas wells primarily in the U.S. states of Wyoming, Texas, West Virginia, Colorado, New Mexico, Montana and Alabama. Saga's natural gas and oil production revenues exceed the hundred million dollar mark annually. Saga was also listed as the 49th largest private company in Colorado in 2006.

The owners of Saga debated  taking the company public in 2004 when their enterprise was supposedly valued over US$400 million; however, the company remains private and maintains very low debt. In 2000, Saga was offered $49.5 million for most of their Texas properties by Delta Petroleum. Instead, the owners of Saga sold one gas property to Delta Petroleum for $3 million in 2000 and sold another 680 wells located in Texas to Latigo Petroleum in 2004. Saga generated a profit of over $100 million when they sold the aforementioned properties. The Saga Petroleum Company has also acquired and sold many other properties including the sale of 32 wells located in Louisiana, Oklahoma and California to Output Exploration Output Exploration Transaction. In addition, Saga owns numerous gas processing facilities and pipelines throughout North America. Saga executed a pipeline agreement with Stealth Energy-based out of Montana, which agreed to use Saga's Rapelje gas pipeline for a royalty of $.75 per MCF in 2008.

Saga continues to acquire natural gas and oil production in throughout the United States, and the company actively drills in Alabama, West Virginia and the Rocky Mountain Region Saga Drilling Permits. In 2007, Saga received over fifty drilling permits in Alabama alone Alabama State Oil and Gas Board. Saga is one of the largest privately held independent petroleum and natural gas producers in the United States, having roughly sixty employees and offices in: Denver, Colorado; Hobbs, New Mexico; Midland, Texas; Powell, Wyoming; Bessemer, Alabama; and Molt, Montana.

Effective May 31, 2022, Saga Petroleum LLC has moved to 240 St Paul Street, Suite 501, Denver, CO 80206. Their contact information is: Phone: 720.328.5070 Fax: 303.592.1013.

Effective November 25, 2019, Saga Petroleum LLC has moved to 15 Smith Road, Suite 5000, Midland, TX 79705.

Effective October 23, 2017, Saga Petroleum LLC has moved to 1050 17th Street, Suite 2460, Denver, CO 80265.

References

Oil companies of the United States
Natural gas companies of the United States
Companies based in Denver